The 2020 European Junior Badminton Championships is being held at the Pajulahti Sports Institute in Lahti, Finland from 29 October to 7 November 2020 to crown the best U-19 badminton players across Europe.

Tournament 
The 2020 European Junior Badminton Championships was organized by Badminton Europe. This tournament consists of team and individual events. There are 16 teams competing in the mixed team event, which is being held from 29 October to 2 November, while the individual events will be held from 2 to 7 November. Lithuania had to withdraw from the tournament due to one of the team member testing positive for COVID-19.

Venue 
This international tournament is being held at Pajulahti Sports Institute in Lahti, Finland.

Medal summary

Medalists

Medal table

Team event

Seeds

Group stage

Group 1

Group 2

Group 3 
Lithuania was originally drawn to Group 3, but withdrawn due to one of the team member tested positive for COVID-19.

Group 4

Knockout stage

References

External links
Official Website
Team Event
Individual Event

European Junior Badminton Championships
European Junior Badminton Championships
European Junior Badminton Championships
European Junior Badminton Championships
International sports competitions hosted by Finland